Just Off Broadway is a 1924 American silent drama film directed by Edmund Mortimer and written by Frederic Hatton and Fanny Hatton. The film stars John Gilbert, Marian Nixon, Trilby Clark, Pierre Gendron, and Ben Hendricks Jr. The film was released on January 20, 1924, by Fox Film Corporation.

Plot
As described in a film magazine review, Jean Lawrence, a dancer, jobless and hungry, faints in a restaurant just off Broadway. Rescued by Nan Norton, she becomes involved in a counterfeiting plot. A prowler is searching in Nan's apartment, who then turns off his flashlight steps out onto the balcony when Nan and Jean arrive. Ten seconds later, two detectives arrive, tell Nan that they "have the goods on her," and arrest Nan. "Smooth" Moran, Nan's sweetheart and leader of the gang, dies in London. He has made a friend and supposed acquaintance of Stephen Moore in Paris, and had asked him to look after Nan. In a series of hectic events, the crooks all seem to be detectives and the detectives crooks. The outcome is a perfectly legitimate romance between Jean and Stephen, who is not a crook but is a millionaire amateur detective.

Cast             
John Gilbert as Stephen Moore
Marian Nixon as Jean Lawrence
Trilby Clark as Nan Norton
Pierre Gendron as Florelle
Ben Hendricks Jr. as Comfort

References

External links
 

1924 films
1920s English-language films
Silent American drama films
1924 drama films
Fox Film films
Films directed by Edmund Mortimer
American silent feature films
American black-and-white films
1920s American films